Moorpark College is a public community college in Moorpark, California. It was established in 1967 with enrollment of 2,500 students and enrolled 14,254 students in 2014. An Exotic Animal Training and Management center houses over 200 animals on campus. It also has the highest degree completion rate among California Community Colleges.

History 

The board of the Ventura County Community College District established Moorpark College in 1967. In addition to the land already owned by the District, Moorpark College expanded into a  parcel of land on Moorpark's eastern boundary, donated by a local ranching family, the Strathearns.

In 1965, the citizens of Ventura County passed a bond for 8 million dollars to build the first part of the college. Construction of the administration, science, technology, gymnasium, and Maintenance buildings, and the Library and Campus Center began in 1966.

Moorpark College officially opened on September 11, 1967. The college's first president, Dr. John Collins, welcomed almost 1,400 students and 50 faculty members.

Dr. Robert Lombardi became the college's second president in 1971. During his tenure, enrollment doubled and the college added emphasis on preparing students to transfer to four-year schools.

Dr. Ray Hearon is the longest-serving president, in office from 1974 to 1989. In 1980, the Moorpark College Foundation was formed to fund construction of an athletic stadium, amphitheater, and observatory. The 6,000-seat stadium, completed in 1985, was named after Paul Griffin Jr., a major benefactor. In 1987, the Charles Temple Observatory, the only public observatory in Ventura County, and Carlsberg Amphitheater were dedicated at the college's 20th anniversary celebration.

Nearby Oxnard College solicited Moorpark's help in establishing a Camarillo Center, located on California State University, Channel Islands's campus.

In 2000, a high school for juniors and seniors opened on the college campus, The High School at Moorpark College (separate from Moorpark High School but part of the Moorpark Unified School District). The first class to graduate in 2001 numbered 25.

In 2004 and 2005, various bond projects were completed, such as a parking lot renovation and all-weather track.

For the 2007 transferring cohort of eligible students (2,252), Moorpark College transferred 130 to a universities in two years, 480 in three years, and 793 and four years.

Bernard Luskin was appointed interim president of Moorpark College in September, 2013. The current president, Luis Pablo Sanchez, was appointed for a term beginning February 3, 2015. After serving as Interim President, Julius Sokenu was installed as President of the college on April 14, 2021.

Athletics 
Moorpark's athletic teams are nicknamed the Raiders. The college currently sponsors eight men's and eight women's varsity teams. The college competes as a member of the California Community College Athletic Association (CCCAA) in the Western State Conference (WSC) for all sports except football and wrestling, which competes in Southern California Football Association (SCFA) and Southern California Wrestling Association (SCWA).

Notable alumni 

Jamal Anderson – professional football player
Christine van Basten-Boddin – Mayor of Beek
Chris Beal (did not graduate) – CIF State Champion wrestler; professional Mixed Martial Artist
April Bowlby (did not graduate) – actor
Brandon Boyd (did not graduate) – musician in Incubus
Colbie Caillat (did not graduate) – pop singer/songwriter
Jason Dolley – actor and musician
Aron Eisenberg - actor and photographer
Nicole Johnson – Miss California 2010, Michael Phelps's wife
 Alex Hoffman-Ellis – professional football player
Gabe Kapler – professional baseball player and manager
 Dave Laut – Olympic shot-putter
Ken Lutz – professional football player
Troy Lyndon - entrepreneur, game developer and business coach
Matt Mahurin – illustrator and photographer
Isaiah Mustafa – professional football player and actor
Jose Pasillas (did not graduate) – musician in Incubus
Julie Scardina – Sea World Busch Gardens Animal Ambassador
Steve Wapnick - professional baseball player
Dan Winters – photographer
Sam Asghari - model and actor, husband of Britney Spears
Kire Horton - actress, comedian, and shapewear model

Moorpark professors
 

Gene Berg, Chemistry

References

External links 

 Official website

 
Universities and colleges in Ventura County, California
California Community Colleges
Moorpark, California
1967 establishments in California
Educational institutions established in 1967
Schools accredited by the Western Association of Schools and Colleges
Buildings and structures in Moorpark, California